Curtis Hudgins Crowe is the drummer for the Athens, Georgia rock band Pylon. He is a native of Marietta, Georgia, and is the middle child of five children. Crowe moved to Athens to attend the University of Georgia art school. His sister Rhett Crowe was later the bass player for the band Guadalcanal Diary, a fixture on the college music scene back in the 1980s and 1990s. He has also been involved in several other music projects such as Strictly American and Dodd Ferrelle and the Tinfoil Stars.

Career
In early 1979, Crowe and his friend Bill Tabor sat and listened to Michael Lachowski and Randy Bewley play the same riff over and over in their practice space which was below his apartment in downtown Athens-the original 40 Watt Club-named for a single bulb on a wire that hung overhead. Crowe went downstairs and knocked on their door and offered his services as a drummer. He had played drums since he was a little boy and one of his dreams was to someday play in a band. The sound of the band came together after he joined and Vanessa Briscoe Hay came aboard as the vocalist. Pylon played several parties and caught the attention of the B-52's who helped them obtain a booking in New York City which was the major goal of the band at the time. After opening for the Gang of Four on their first two United States tour dates, Pylon was able to keep returning to play dates in the northeastern United States and began to record for DB Records in Atlanta, Georgia. They opened for the B-52's in Central Park, toured England in late 1980 and released their first album Gyrate.

Crowe came up with the idea, after seeing some of the clubs that existed in the Northeast, that it was possible to open your own club without too much effort or money, so with the help of his friend Paul Scales, the 40 Watt Club opened in downtown Athens above Yudy's Subs in what had been something called the "Crow's nest". The club proved to be very popular and the floor had to be reinforced with portable beams for all the heavy dancing taking place overhead.

Pylon recorded another album and two singles and broke up in 1983 after touring with U2 for a few of the dates on their first American tour. Pylon was becoming too much like a business for some of the members' tastes, so it was agreed to break up and they did.

Crowe married and settled down and finished school. Athens, GA inside/out was released and there seemed to be more interest in Pylon than ever. Pylon reformed, but this time with more business-like practices in place. They recorded another album and toured with R.E.M. and the B-52's. They had a manager. But Pylon broke up again.

Crowe and his wife went on to have two children and he began to work in the film/TV industry as a construction coordinator. He has worked on films like Blue Crush, where he was responsible for "the rock", Cool Runnings and more recently, the first season of Lost, We are Marshall and Californication. He is now divorced, but maintains an amiable relationship with his former wife and children.

Pylon reformed for fun from 2005 to 2009.  DFA Records reissued Gyrate on CD, Pylon's first album with bonus tracks, and called it Gyrate Plus.

Discography
With Pylon
 Cool/Dub  7" single (Caution Records 1979)
 Gyrate LP (DB records, Armageddon 1980)
 Pylon !! EP (DB records, Armageddon 1980)
 Crazy/M-Train  7" single (DD Records 1981)
 Beep/Altitude  7" single (DB Records 1982)
 Four Minutes/Beep/Altitude  EP (DB Records 1982)
 Chomp LP (DB Records 1983)
 Hits LP/CD (DB Records 1988)
 Chain LP/CD (Sky Records 1990)
 Gyrate Plus CD (DFA Records 2007)

Filmography
Californication (construction coordinator) (11 episodes, 2007)
We Are Marshall (2006) (construction coordinator)
The Ultimate Gift (2006) (construction coordinator)
A Lot Like Love (2005) (construction coordinator)
Lost (2004) TV series (construction coordinator) (unknown episodes)
I Left Me (2004) (art director)
Catch That Kid (2004) (construction coordinator)
a.k.a. Mission Without Permission (Europe: English title) (USA: working title)
a.k.a. Mission: Possible - Diese Kids sind nicht zu fassen! (Germany: TV title)
Edge of America (2003) (TV) (construction coordinator)
a.k.a. On the Edge (Europe: English title)
Blue Crush (2002) (construction coordinator)
Welcome to Collinwood (2002) (construction coordinator)
Safecrackers oder Diebe haben's schwer (Germany)
Crazy/Beautiful (2001) (construction coordinator)
The Way of the Gun (2000) (construction coordinator)
The Rage: Carrie 2 (1999) (construction foreman)
A Secret Life (1999) (TV) (construction coordinator)
a.k.a. Breach of Trust (UK)
My Stepson, My Lover (1997) (TV) (construction coordinator)
a.k.a. Love, Murder and Deceit
a.k.a. No Recourse
Promised Land (1996) TV series (construction coordinator) (unknown episodes)
a.k.a. Home of the Brave
Inflammable (1995) (TV) (construction coordinator)
Murderous Intent (1995) (TV) (construction coordinator)
Against Her Will: The Carrie Buck Story (1994) (TV) (construction coordinator)
Cool Runnings (1993) (construction coordinator)
Going to Extremes (1992) TV series (construction foreman) (unknown episodes)
 Athens, GA.: Inside/Out (1987), archive footage (Pylon)

References

Reynolds, Simon: Rip It Up and Start Again: Postpunk 1978-1984, Penguin Books, February 2006, p. 264.
Strong,Martin Charles: The Great Indie Discography, Canongate Books, October 2003, p. 282.
Christgau,Robert: Christgau's Consumer Guide-the 80's, Pantheon Books, 1990, pp. 329, 498, 506.

External links
 Pylon official web site
 PARTY ZONE: a tribute to Pylon
 Pylon unofficial web site
 [ AllMusic entry on Pylon]

University of Georgia alumni
Musicians from Georgia (U.S. state)
American drummers
Living people
Year of birth missing (living people)
American new wave musicians
Pylon (band) members